The abbreviation EUMC can refer to:

 The European Monitoring Centre on Racism and Xenophobia.
The European Union Military Committee.